Alfred Dreier (20 January 1940 – 16 February 2011) was a German jurist and local politician from the Christian Social Union of Bavaria. He occupied some posts including Minister of Culture of Bavaria from 1986 to 1987.

Honours
1995: Order of Merit of the Federal Republic of Germany
1998: Medal for outstanding services to the local government

References

1940 births
2011 deaths
Politicians from Munich
Jurists from Bavaria
Christian Social Union in Bavaria politicians
Recipients of the Cross of the Order of Merit of the Federal Republic of Germany